Loreto College, Loreto Convent, Loreto School and similar may refer to a number of Roman Catholic schools throughout the world associated with the Sisters of Loreto.

Australia
Loreto College Coorparoo, Queensland
Loreto College, Marryatville, South Australia 
Loreto College, Victoria, in Ballarat
Loreto Convent, Claremont, Western Australia
Loreto Kirribilli, New South Wales
Loreto Mandeville Hall, Victoria
Loreto Nedlands, Western Australia
Loreto Normanhurst, New South Wales

India
Loreto College, Kolkata
Loreto Convent, Asansol
Loreto Convent, Darjeeling
Loreto Convent Lucknow
Loreto Convent School, Delhi
Loreto Convent, Tara Hall, Shimla
Loreto Schools, Kolkata
St. Agnes' Loreto Day School, Lucknow

Ireland
Loreto Abbey, Dalkey 
Loreto College, Coleraine 
Loreto College, Foxrock
Loreto College, Mullingar
Loreto College, Swords, 
Loreto Convent Secondary School, Letterkenny
Loreto Secondary School, Kilkenny
Loreto Secondary School, Navan
 Loreto College, Crumlin

Kenya
Loreto High School, Limuru
Loreto Convent Msongari

Mauritius
Loreto College of Rose-Hill, Mauritius
Loreto College Saint Pierre, Mauritius

United Kingdom

England
Loreto College, Manchester
Loreto College, St Albans
Loreto Grammar School, Altrincham
Loreto High School, Chorlton, Manchester

Northern Ireland
Loreto College, Coleraine, County Londonderry
Loreto Grammar School, Omagh, County Tyrone

See also
Loretto (disambiguation)